This is a list of Norwegian television related events from 1997.

Events
Unknown - Kjell Inge Torgersen, performing as Sting wins the second series of Stjerner i sikte.

Debuts

Television shows

1990s
Sesam Stasjon (1991-1999)
Stjerner i sikte (1996-2002)

Ending this year

Births

Deaths

See also
1997 in Norway